Jonnalagadda Gurappa Chetty is an Indian painter, craftsman and writer, known for his contributions for the revival of the Indian textile art form of Kalamkari. He is a recipient of honours such as Shilpaguru, Rasthriya Samman, Tulsi Samman and Kamaladevi Vishwa Karigar Award. The Government of India awarded him the fourth highest civilian honour of the Padma Shri, in 2008, for his contributions to Kalamkari art.

Education and career
Jonnalagadda was born to J. Lakshmaiah Chetty, in a family of Kalamkari artists at Srikalahasti, a temple town in the Chittoor district of Andhra Pradesh in 1937 and started learning the art from his father from an early age. His career started as a school teacher but he continued painting, focusing on Kalamkari art, which soon earned him appreciation. He is the author of three books in Telugu, Bharata Ratna Mala, Bhagavatha Mani Mala and Vraatha Pani (Kalamkari), besides contributing to an English publication by Parampaarik Kaarigaar.

Awards
 2008: Received Padma Shri award by the Government of India in 2008 for his contributions to Kalamkari art.

See also 
 Kalamkari

References

External links 
 

Recipients of the Padma Shri in arts
1937 births
Living people
Painters from Andhra Pradesh
People from Chittoor district
20th-century Indian painters
Indian male writers
Telugu people
20th-century Indian non-fiction writers
Indian male painters
20th-century Indian male artists